Levan Kakubava  (born 15 October 1990) is Georgian football player, currently playing for FC Saburtalo Tbilisi as a centre back.

Career statistics (Dinamo Tbilisi)

External links
 
 UEFA profile

1990 births
Living people
Footballers from Georgia (country)
Georgia (country) under-21 international footballers
Georgia (country) international footballers
Association football defenders
Erovnuli Liga players
FC Dinamo Tbilisi players
FC Metalurgi Rustavi players
FC Spartaki Tskhinvali players
AC Omonia players
FC Samtredia players
FC Chikhura Sachkhere players
FC Saburtalo Tbilisi players